Nalaya Brown (Tenerife, 19 November 1983) is a Spanish singer who works on the European dance circuit. Her voice has rhythm&blues, soul and latin influences.
She sang in clubs in Spain, South America and half Europe. 
Nalaya attended to Rock In Rio Brasil, Rio Music Conference, Privilege Ibiza, Amnesia Ibiza, Ushuaia Hotel Ibiza, Fabrik Madrid, Cavalli Dubai, Privilege Buzios, Pachá Buzios, The Week Brasil, Circuit Festival Barcelona...

Also, Brown is the voice of the Spanish production 'SuperMartxé', the most important party in Europe, that has amazing performances all over the world, at the best night clubs, with a World Guinness record of capacity with more than 15.000 people in one club. The videoclip of SuperMartXé anthem, was sung by Nalaya and filmed with Paris Hilton. After hits as SuperMartXé, Don't Stop Till' You Get Enough, Nalaya is working in her own album, with soul music.

In 2015, Brown attended the Spanish TV talent show La Voz (The Voice, Talent Show), where she arrives to live acts, winning her previous battles, and saved by Antonio Orozco who said about her that she was ".. an authentic revelation", with performances of Lady Gaga - "Born This Way" (Audiciones a ciegas) and Beyoncé - "Crazy in Love" (Directos).

Awards 
 2014: Best International Vocalist (DNA Balada Brasil)
 2015: Best Vocalist (VMA Vicious Music Awards)

Discography 
 2018: «Dreaming» (Albert Neve & Abel Ramos feat. Nalaya)
 2017: «Una vez más» (Nalaya feat. Danny Romero)
 2017: «Don't Stop Moving» (Nalaya feat. Breno Barreto)
 2017: «Be Mine» (Nalaya feat. Dan Slater y JimJam)
 2016: «Love Me Like A Diva» (Yinon Yahel feat. Nalaya)
 2015: «Call To Me» (Roger Sanchez feat. Nalaya)
 2014: «Arena» (Carlos Gallardo feat. Nalaya) - GT2 Records
 2013: «Waterfall» (Fran Marín feat. Nalaya) - Sony Music
 2013: «Leave Me Alone» (Felipe Guerra feat. Nalaya) - Universal Music Brasil
 2012: «Let You Go» (Christopher S. feat. Nalaya) - Roster
 2011: «Cuba» (Abel The Kid & Luis Ponce feat. Nalaya) - Subliminal Records
 2011: «Feel Alive» (Filipe Guerra feat. Nalaya) (2011)
 2010: «Don't Stop Till You Get Enough» (Juanjo Martín & Albert Neve feat. Nalaya) - Blanco y Negro
 2010: «Over You» (Nalaya & Leo Blanco, Vitti & Hugo Sánchez)
 2010: «Mecandance» (Nacho Cano feat. Nalaya)
 2010: «SuperMartXé»  (Juanjo Martín & Albert Neve feat. Nalaya)
 2010: «Love At Loft» (Dj Puku, Axel & Nalaya)
 2018: «Wepa» (Karin Hass & David El Olmo feat. Nalaya) (2008)

References 
iTunes Music Preview 

Related by SuperMartXé 
Interview Tilllate.com (Spain) 
Agencia EFE - Noticias 
Telecinco TV La voz

External References 
 www.nalaya.com Site oficial
 Nalaya's Facebook | Official

1983 births
Living people
Singers from the Canary Islands
21st-century Spanish singers
21st-century Spanish women singers